Daniel Ryan Reimold (January 25, 1981 – August 20, 2015) was an assistant professor of journalism at Saint Joseph's University in Philadelphia, Pennsylvania. There, he advised The Hawk, the student-run newspaper. He also wrote the  college journalism blog College Media Matters.

Career
Daniel Reimold earned his Bachelor of Arts degree in communication studies from Ursinus College in Collegeville, Pennsylvania and his Master's degree in journalism from Temple University in Philadelphia, Pennsylvania. He earned his Ph.D. in journalism and mass communication, and a certificate in contemporary history from Ohio University in Athens, Ohio. He had taught at the University of Tampa, in Tampa, Florida. Reimold was a visiting assistant professor of journalism in Nanyang Technological University in Singapore and maintained the student journalism industry blog 'College Media Matters', which is affiliated with the College Media Association.

Death
Reimold's death was announced on August 21, 2015. Coroners reported that he suffered a seizure.  He was 34 years old.

Awards
2007 Graduate Associate Outstanding Teacher Award at Ohio University in Athens, Ohio 
2004 First recipient of The Philadelphia Inquirers Ralph Vigoda Memorial Award for passion in journalism

Past worksPublished articles in outlets such as 
Journalism History
College Media Review
The Philadelphia Inquirer
Tampa Bay Times (formerly known as St. Petersburg Times)
Poynter Online
The Washington Post Published articles in books including:''' 
Peck, Lee A., and Guy Reel. Media Ethics at Work: True Stories from Young Professionals. Thousand Oaks: CQ, 2013. Print.
Kanigel, Rachele. The Student Newspaper Survival Guide. Ames, IA: Blackwell, 2006. Print

Books
Reimold, Daniel. Journalism of Ideas: Brainstorming, Developing, and Selling Stories in the Digital Age. New York, N. Y.: Routledge, 2013. Print.
 Reimold, Daniel. Sex and the University: Celebrity, Controversy, and a Student Journalism Revolution.'' New Brunswick, NJ: Rutgers UP, 2010. Print. According to WorldCat, the book is held in 888 libraries

References

External links
Huffingpost.com
Usatodayeducate.com
Collegemediamatters.com 
Pbs.org
Poynter.org

1981 births
2015 deaths
Place of birth missing
Saint Joseph's University faculty
Ursinus College alumni
Temple University alumni
Ohio University alumni
University of Tampa faculty
American male journalists